Maragusan, officially the Municipality of Maragusan, is a 1st class municipality in the province of Davao de Oro, Philippines. According to the 2020 census, it has a population of 64,412 people.

History 
The area in what is now Maragusan is a valley that in the past were inhabited solely by native Mansakan people who made their living by engaging in slash-and-burn agricultural practices. They identified themselves as “Man-Agusan” which means those living on the banks of the Agusan River which had its source within the boundaries of the present municipality. 

The area which is now Maragusan was made part of the municipality of Doña Alicia, now Mabini, which was created in May 28, 1953 by virtue of Executive Order No. 596 of Pres. Elpidio Quirino. By the time the town of Doña Alicia was created, the valley remained undiscovered by settlers until in 1955 a pilot and a rancher from Lake Leonard discovered it by accident while travelling off-course. This triggered the creation of an agricultural settlement located in the Aguakan Springs which is now the location of the town center.

Geography

Climate

Barangays
Maragusan is politically subdivided into 24 barangays.

Demographics

It ranks 3rd most populated municipality in the first district of Davao de Oro.

Economy

See also
List of renamed cities and municipalities in the Philippines

References

External links
 Maragusan Profile at the DTI Cities and Municipalities Competitive Index
 [ Philippine Standard Geographic Code]
Philippine Census Information

Municipalities of Davao de Oro